Carlo il Calvo (Charles the Bald) is an  in 3 acts by Nicola Porpora that premiered in the spring of 1738 at Rome's Teatro delle Dame.

Recording
 2022: Julia Lezhneva, Suzanne Jerosme, Max Emanuel Cenčić, Franco Fagioli, Bruno de Sá, Petr Nekoranec, Nian Wang, Armonia Atenea; conductor: George Petrou 3 CDs  Parnassus

References

External links
 
 
 "Libretto", Internet Archive

1738 operas
Italian-language operas
Operas by Nicola Porpora
Operas based on real people
Operas set in the 9th century